Juan José Cabezudo (died 1860) was a Peruvian chef and street-food vendor, who worked in Lima during the first half of the 19th century. Writers such as Ricardo Palma wrote about his food as well as his homosexuality.

Biography
Whilst little is known about Cabezudo's early life, he is recorded as being of African descent. However, more detail has been recorded about his career and personality. Cabezudo was a chef, who had a street-food stall in the Escribanos portal, a place very close to the Plaza Mayor in Lima, where he served typical Peruvian dishes, including tamales. He also had a food stall at the exit of the Acho bullring. When Simón Bolívar left Peru, Cabezudo was commissioned to cook the farewell dinner.

Cabezudo's food stalls were widely known in Lima at the time, and he was commercially successful. Nevertheless, he gambled much of his earnings in games of chance at the Chorrillos spa. His homosexuality was also discussed by writers and journalists during his life. According to historian Magally Alegre, Lima in the 19th century was a city where gay men could lead comparatively open lives.

According to historian Ricardo Palma, he died in Chorrillos in 1860, destitute.

Historiography

Cabezudo's life was first recorded by Peruvian historian Ricardo Palma, who wrote a short biography about his fame, his homosexuality and his transvestism. The travel writer Max Radiguet mentions his life. He was also depicted in a series of watercolours by Francisco Fierro, as well as Francisco Javier Cortés, and was photographed by Eugenio Courret.

References

External links
 
 Ño Juan José Cabezudo El maricón

Date of birth unknown
1860 deaths
Peruvian chefs
Gay men
Gamblers
People from Lima
Peruvian LGBT people
19th-century LGBT people
Peruvian people of African descent
LGBT chefs